The McDonald's PlayPlace is an amusement commercial playground attached to a McDonald's restaurant, that features play areas such as tube mazes, slides, ball pits, and video games, as well as tables for eating. First started in 1971 at the Chula Vista, California location, they are usually rainbow colored and themed after McDonaldland.

History

The McDonald's PlayPlace first appeared in California in 1971, and debuted for McDonald's franchisees at the 1972 Illinois State Fair.

In 1991, McDonald's created a chain of family entertainment centers based on PlayPlaces called Leaps and Bounds, that eventually merged into Discovery Zone and Chuck E. Cheese.

In 1999, the U.S. Consumer Product Safety Commission fined McDonald's $4 million, after failing to report over 400 injuries that children sustained after using the Big Mac Climber jungle gyms.

In March 2020, all PlayPlaces in restaurants located in the United States were closed due to health concerns related to the COVID-19 pandemic.

In the 2010s and 2020s, PlayPlaces have less commonly appeared in new and renovated restaurants, reportedly due to factors such as health and safety concerns, decreased usage, families eating out less, a shift in marketing from kids and families to young adults, and McDonald's wanting to present a more "sleek and modern" image of the chain.

Locations

The world's largest McDonald's PlayPlace at the World's Largest Entertainment McDonald's in Orlando, Florida, features family entertainment center-like attractions, including arcade games and pizza. It was opened in 1976. A UFO and outer space themed PlayPlace in Roswell, New Mexico was built in 2004 and updated in 2019.

References

External links
McDonald's PlayPlaces
Specialist Soft Play Designers
Wedanta Indoor Home Playground

Playgrounds
Video arcades
Amusement parks
Indoor amusement parks
Amusement parks opened in 1971
1971 establishments in the United States